Gol Tappeh-ye Kheyrabad (also Romanized as Gol Tappeh-ye Kheyrābād; also known as Gultapah-ye Kheyrābād) is a village in Kaghazkonan-e Markazi Rural District, Kaghazkonan District, Meyaneh County, East Azerbaijan Province, Iran. At the 2006 census, its population was 88, in 29 families.

References 

Populated places in Meyaneh County